Bill Hader is an American actor, comedian, writer, producer, and director.

Hader has received twenty-five Primetime Emmy Award nominations for his work on Saturday Night Live, South Park, Barry, and Documentary Now!. He won three Emmy Awards, including Outstanding Animated Program for South Park in 2009, and two consecutive wins for Outstanding Lead Actor in a Comedy Series for Barry in 2018 and 2019. He also received three Golden Globe Award nominations and six Screen Actors Guild Award nominations for his work as an actor in Barry. As a producer, he received two Producers Guild of America Award nominations and as a director, he received three Directors Guild of America Award wins. As a writer, he received six Writers Guild of America Award nominations and three wins. Hader has also received critical acclaim and award nominations for his work as an actor in independent films, such as Adventureland (2009) and The Skeleton Twins (2014).

Major associations

Primetime Emmy Award

Golden Globe Award

Guild awards

Screen Actors Guild Award

Writers Guild of America Award

Directors Guild of America Award

Producers Guild of America Award

Critics awards

References

External links

Lists of awards received by American actor